The Diamond Peak Wilderness is a wilderness area straddling the Cascade crest and includes the Diamond Peak volcano.  It is located within two National Forests - the Willamette National Forest on the west and the Deschutes National Forest on the east.

Designation
On February 5, 1957, the Forest Service established the  Diamond Peak Wild Area.  Upon passage of the federal Wilderness Act in 1964 it was reclassified as wilderness.  With the passage of the Oregon Wilderness Act of 1984, Diamond Peak Wilderness increased in size to its present .

Geography

At , Diamond Peak is the highest peak in the wilderness. Diamond Peak is a shield volcano formed as the entire Cascade Range was undergoing volcanic activity and uplift. Glaciers carved the large volcanic peak, and when they receded, the bulk of the mountain remained, with snowfields near the summit and dozens of small lakes surrounding the peak. Approximately  of the Pacific Crest National Scenic Trail pass through this wilderness. Another  of trail, including the  Diamond Peak Trail, stretches the length of the west side of the peak.

Vegetation
Nearly the entire Diamond Peak Wilderness is covered with mixed stands of mountain hemlock, lodgepole and western white pine, and silver, noble and other true firs.  Alpine flowers, including varieties of mimulus, trillium, lupine, penstemon, heather, and Indian paintbrush, are common along trails, lake shores, streams and in the meadows.  Huckleberry and dwarf manzanita are common in the dense underbrush.

Wildlife

The Diamond Peak Wilderness is home to black-tailed deer, mule deer, and elk. In winter, the mule deer migrate eastward out of the wilderness to the sage desert, while black-tailed deer and elk drop down the west slope.  Black bear and small mammals including marmots, snowshoe rabbits, squirrels, pine martens, foxes, and pikas inhabit the area all year long.  The raven, Clark's nutcracker, Oregon jay, and water ouzel frequent the forest and streams year-round.  Bufflehead and goldeneye ducks occasionally nest near the lakes.

Recreation
Recreational activities in the Diamond Peak Wilderness include hiking, horseback riding, camping, hunting, fishing, and mountain climbing.  Some  of trails cross the wilderness, including  the Pacific Crest Trail along the east slope of Diamond Peak.  Marie Lake, Divide Lake, and Rockpile Lake are popular base camps for the climb up Diamond Peak.  Mount Yoran and Lakeview Mountain can also be climbed.  Winter is popular for snowshoeing and cross-country skiing.

See also
 List of Oregon Wildernesses
 List of U.S. Wilderness Areas

References

External links
 Willamette National Forest - Diamond Peak Wilderness
 Deschutes & Ochoco National Forests - Diamond Peak Wilderness

Wilderness areas of Oregon
Protected areas of Klamath County, Oregon
Protected areas of Lane County, Oregon
Willamette National Forest
Deschutes National Forest
1964 establishments in Oregon
Protected areas established in 1964